Denis Kudla (born August 17, 1992) is an American professional tennis player. A product of the Junior Tennis Champions Center, he has won eight Challenger singles titles and nine Challenger doubles titles in his career. His career-high ATP singles ranking is World No. 53, achieved in May 2016. His career-high ATP doubles ranking is World No. 133, achieved in August 2018.

Personal life
Kudla's family moved from Ukraine to Fairfax, Virginia on his first birthday. He began playing tennis at age 7, in part because his older brother Nikita played tennis, but also because many of his father's friends played. He would tag along as Nikita took informal lessons from their father in Fairfax's Van Dyck Park. Kudla's father, Vladimir Kudla, took his family out of Ukraine shortly after the Soviet Union collapsed. Kudla's parents came to the USA not speaking a word of English, but learned it within a few years.

His mother got permission to pick him up from elementary school one hour early so they could go from Fairfax to the Junior Tennis Champions Center (JTCC)  in College Park, Maryland, where she'd wait through his two-hour practices, drive him home while he slept, then wake him for dinner and homework. At age 13, they moved to Arlington, where Kudla was set to matriculate at Washington-Lee High School. But six hours of court time each day left no room for traditional high school, so starting in ninth grade, he was home-schooled at JTCC and had to commute on his own to practice in College Park via Metro, lugging two racket bags and changing trains twice during rush hour. "My parents were strict, but not crazy strict. I was never spoiled. I wanted tennis. It was always my dream." One of Kudla's favorite experiences was visiting the White House for the 2013 Easter Egg Roll as he got to meet President Barack Obama, and NFL Pro Bowlers Anquan Boldin and Adrian Peterson.

Kudla is an avid fan of sports, as he supports the Philadelphia Eagles, Washington Capitals, Washington Wizards, Washington Nationals and occasionally the San Francisco 49ers, San Francisco Giants, and Boston Celtics.  Kudla models his game after Spaniard David Ferrer, and his idol is Roger Federer.

Early in his career, Kudla worked out with trainer Greg Petrosian in Boca Raton, Florida, where he still trains. He was previously coached by Billy Heiser and Diego Moyano.

Playing equipment and sponsorships
Kudla started playing tennis with a Head racquet, and then switched to Wilson when he was 11. Kudla was sponsored by Wilson early in his career and later signed a contract with Tecnifibre in 2010. Kudla used Luxilon strings, but switched to Tecnifibre string.  He likes to hit his balls a little flatter, so Luxilon had given him that little extra pop. Kudla generally strings his racquets at 51 both ways. He restrings his racquets for practice, but plays with new ones during matches. He estimates that he spends around $12,000 a year on stringing each year.

Kudla has a sponsorship deal with Lacoste, and is represented by tennis agent Sam Duvall at Topnotch Management.

Junior tennis
By age ten, Kudla had enrolled at the US Tennis Association's prestigious regional training center at College Park, Maryland. There, he was able to practice and play alongside other rising young American stars and learn from some of the country's finest coaches. "It was a great environment to be there", Kudla says. "All my friends were close; I got to live at home and play at one of the best academies in the country."  In 2008 as the number one seed, he won the 16-and-under age bracket at the Orange Bowl, beating future University of Virginia tennis player, Mitchell Frank.  At the time, both players trained together at College Park.  With the win, which was his first in major international competition, Kudla became the first American to win the Boys’ 16s title since Donald Young in 2003.  

Kudla also participated in the 2008 BNP Paribas Showdown vs Junior A. Ore at Madison Square Garden, as they were the under-card for Roger Federer and Pete Sampras who competed against each other afterwards.  Soon after, Kudla turned pro even though he had great interest from the University of Virginia as he was the 2nd ranked senior in the nation. Kudla reached a career-high combined junior ranking of world no. 3. He believes the turning point in his junior tennis career was when he came from behind to beat junior tennis prodigy Trey Hatcher of Knoxville, Tennessee 7–5, 7–6 at the Boys 12s National Hard Court Championships in 2003.  

His best result was reaching the final of the 2010 US Open for boys, where, despite taking the first set, he lost the final to Jack Sock.

Professional career

2008–2011: ATP debut
Kudla reached the semifinals of his second professional tour event, U.S.A. F15 ITF Futures event, held in New York in June 2008.

He first played an ATP Tour main-draw match six weeks later, in doubles at the 2008 Legg Mason Tennis Classic, partnering with fellow junior Junior A. Ore. The pair, a wildcard entry, lost their first-round match to Lucas Arnold Ker, and Eduardo Schwank. Two years later, he was given a wildcard for the singles main draw of the 2010 Campbell's Hall of Fame Tennis Championships and reached the second round, where he lost to fellow American Ryan Harrison.

His first tour-level doubles match win came in reaching the second round in doubles at the 2011 U.S. Men's Clay Court Championships in Houston, Texas partnering Donald Young. Kudla reached the quarterfinals in singles at the 2011 Campbell's Hall of Fame Tennis Championships, having knocked off big-serving Ivo Karlović in three sets, and then second seed Grigor Dimitrov. Kudla lost to qualifier Michael Yani in three sets in the quarterfinals.

Kudla played his first Legg Mason Tennis Classic in Washington, D.C. in 2011, losing in the first round to Tobias Kamke.

2012–2013: Grand Slam tournament debut
In 2012, Kudla qualified for the main draw of a Grand Slam for the first time at the Australian Open. He lost in the first round to Tommy Haas. He qualified for the 2012 SAP Open in San Jose, California and beat Jack Sock in the first round. In March 2012, Denis Kudla lost to Roger Federer in the second round of Indian Wells Masters tournament.

In 2013 at the Australian Open he lost in the first round of qualifying to Julian Reister. Then at the French Open he qualified for the main draw before losing to Jan Hájek. At Wimbledon he again qualified for the main draw and won his first grand slam match against James Duckworth. He could not repeat the victory, losing to Ivan Dodig while plagued with a back injury throughout the three sets.  At the 2013 US Open, he beat Jiří Veselý in four set before losing to Tomáš Berdych.

2014–2015: Wimbledon fourth round
After a lackluster start to the 2014 season, he was able to qualify and win his first match at Wimbledon against Marsel İlhan, before falling to Kei Nishikori. The following week, he returned to the US and won the 2014 Winnetka Challenger. He had a bout with mononucleosis, however, that caused him to miss most of the fall schedule.

He returned to form in the 2015 grass-court season, making the finals of Subiton Challenger, before avenging his finals loss the following week to defeat Matthew Ebden and win the first edition of the 2015 Aegon Ilkley Trophy Challenger. Based on this success, he was rewarded with a wildcard into the main draw of Wimbledon. He began the tournament by defeating 28th seed Pablo Cuevas despite losing the first two sets. In the following rounds, he defeated Alexander Zverev in four sets and Santiago Giraldo in five sets. Kudla was narrowly beaten in the fourth round by US Open champion Marin Čilić.

2016–2018: High career singles and doubles rankings
In 2016 Kudla made it to the second round of the Australian Open and lost in the first round of the year's remaining three Slams. He reached his career-high singles ranking of No. 53 on May 23, 2016. He also competed in singles at the 2016 Rio Olympics for the United States.

In 2017 Kudla failed to qualify for any of the Grand Slam Tournaments.

At the 2018 Australian Open, post-qualifying, Kudla beat compatriot Steve Johnson in the first round of the tournament, and took the first two sets off of the fifth seed Dominic Thiem in the second round. Kudla made the main draw of the 2018 French Open when he beat Jürgen Zopp in the final round of qualifying. However he lost to the 26th seed Damir Džumhur in the first round.
He reached his career-high doubles ranking of No. 133 on August 27, 2018. 

He finished the year 2018 with a singles high ranking of No. 63 his best year-end ranking in his career.

2019–2021: US Open and Wimbledon third rounds
Kudla made the third round of the 2019 US Open for the first time in his career defeating No. 27 seed Dušan Lajović before losing to World No. 1 Novak Djokovic.

In January 2021, Kudla tested positive for COVID-19 during the Australian Open qualifying event in Doha.

In June at the 2021 Wimbledon Championships, he reached the third round as a qualifier, for the first time since 2015 when he reached the fourth round which was his best showing at any Grand Slam. He defeated 30th seed Alejandro Davidovich Fokina in a five set match and veteran Andreas Seppi in the second round. He was eventually ousted by Novak Djokovic but not before giving a tough fight to the world No. 1 in all three sets played.

2022: Back to top 100, Miami Masters third round, Major doubles quarterfinal
He returned to the top 100 at World No. 84 on 21 March 2022 following his eight Challenger title at the 2022 Arizona Tennis Classic in Phoenix. He followed that performance by a third round showing at the 2022 Miami Open for the first time in his career at the Masters 1000 level.

With partner Jack Sock he reached his first Grand Slam quarterfinal at the 2022 Wimbledon Championships.

2023
He entered the 2023 Australian Open as a lucky loser where he defeated Russian Roman Safiullin to reach the second round for the fourth time at this Major.

At the 2023 Delray Beach Open he won his opening match against Jordan Thompson.

Performance timelines

Singles
Current through the 2023 Delray Beach Open.

Doubles

ATP Challenger and ITF Futures finals

Singles: 21 (10–11)

Doubles: 19 (11–8)

Junior Grand Slam finals

Singles: 1 (1 runner-up)

References

External links
 
 

Living people
1992 births
American male tennis players
Sportspeople from Kyiv
Tennis people from Virginia
Ukrainian emigrants to the United States
Tennis players at the 2011 Pan American Games
Pan American Games competitors for the United States
Tennis players at the 2016 Summer Olympics
Olympic tennis players of the United States
People with acquired American citizenship